Marek Suker (born October 31, 1982) is a Polish football striker who plays for Orzeł Miedary.

Career

Club
In December 2010, he joined Zagłębie Sosnowiec on one and half year contract.

References

External links
 

1982 births
Living people
Ruch Chorzów players
Polish footballers
Ruch Radzionków players
Zagłębie Sosnowiec players
Sportspeople from Bytom
Association football forwards